Las Rosas is a city and one of the 119 Municipalities of Chiapas, in southern Mexico.

As of 2010, the municipality had a total population of 25,530, up from 21,100 as of 2005. It covers an area of 233.5 km².

As of 2010, the city of Las Rosas had a population of 18,817. Other than the city of Las Rosas, the municipality had 130 localities, none of which had a population over 1,000.

In June 2020 some inhabitants attacked the vehicles of health workers, believing that dengue and coronavirus precautions were measures to wipe out the local population.

References

Municipalities of Chiapas